Alessandro Bovo (born 1 January 1969) is a retired water polo defense player from Italy, who represented his native country at two consecutive Summer Olympics: 1992 and 1996.

After having won the gold medal in Barcelona, Spain Bovo claimed bronze with the men's national team at the 1996 Summer Olympics in Atlanta, United States. He also won one world title, two European titles and one FINA World Cup with the national squad during his career.

See also
 Italy men's Olympic water polo team records and statistics
 List of Olympic champions in men's water polo
 List of Olympic medalists in water polo (men)
 List of world champions in men's water polo
 List of World Aquatics Championships medalists in water polo

References
 RAI Profile

External links
 
 

1969 births
Living people
Italian male water polo players
Water polo players at the 1992 Summer Olympics
Water polo players at the 1996 Summer Olympics
Olympic water polo players of Italy
Olympic gold medalists for Italy
Olympic bronze medalists for Italy
Water polo players from Genoa
Olympic medalists in water polo
Medalists at the 1996 Summer Olympics
Medalists at the 1992 Summer Olympics
World Aquatics Championships medalists in water polo